Love Survives may refer to:

 Love Survives (album), an album by Brother Henry
 "Love Survives" (song), a song from the 1989 film All Dogs Go to Heaven
 "Love Survive", a 2011 song by Scandal